Ilha Comprida (Portuguese for "long island") is a municipality in the state of São Paulo in Brazil. Stretching southwest along the Atlantic coast of the state, it is coextensive with the barrier island of Ilha Comprida, the longest of its kind in the state. The municipality was founded in 1993 after the merger of the part of Ilha Comprida that belonged to the city of Cananéia with the section of the island that was administered by the city of Iguape.

The Ilha Comprida has an average annual temperature of 24 °C. The population is 11,362 (2020 est.) in an area of 192.1 km2.
The island is covered by the Ilha Comprida Environmental Protection Area, which defines zoning and allowable land use in an effort to reduce environmental damage from human occupation.
The municipality contains 55% of the  Guará Area of Relevant Ecological Interest, created in 2008.
It is part of the Iguape-Cananéia-Paranaguá estuary lagoon complex.

References

External links 

 Official site

Populated places established in 1992
Atlantic islands of Brazil
Populated coastal places in São Paulo (state)
Municipalities in São Paulo (state)